Frank A. Langella Jr. (born January 1, 1938) is an American actor known for his commanding roles on stage and screen. Langella eschewed the career of a traditional film star by always making the stage the focal point of his career, appearing on Broadway. He's received numerous accolades including four Tony Awards, a Drama Desk Award and a Screen Actors Guild Award as well as nominations for an Academy Award, a BAFTA Award, a Emmy Award, and two Golden Globe Awards, 

He has won four Tony Awards: two for Best Leading Actor in a Play for his performance as Richard Nixon in Peter Morgan's Frost/Nixon and as André in Florian Zeller's The Father, and two for Best Featured Actor in a Play for his performances in Edward Albee's Seascape and Ivan Turgenev's Fortune's Fool. His other Tony-nominated roles were in Dracula in 1978, Match in 2004, and Man and Boy in 2012.

His reprisal of the Nixon role in the film production of Frost/Nixon directed by Ron Howard earned him an Academy Award nomination for Best Actor. Langella's other notable film roles include in Diary of a Mad Housewife (1970), Mel Brooks' The Twelve Chairs (1970), Dracula (1979), Dave (1993), The Ninth Gate (1999), Good Night, and Good Luck (2005), Starting Out in the Evening (2007), Wall Street: Money Never Sleeps (2010), Robot & Frank (2012), Noah (2014), Captain Fantastic (2016), and The Trial of the Chicago 7 (2020). 

He is also known for his role as Supreme Court Justice Warren Burger in the HBO movie Muhammad Ali's Greatest Fight (2013) and as Richard Russell Jr. in All the Way (2016). Langella also is known for his recurring role as Gabriel, the KGB handler for the lead characters in the FX series The Americans (2013–2017) and Sebastian Piccirillo in the Showtime series Kidding (2018–2020).

Early life
Langella, an Italian American, was born January 1, 1938, in Bayonne, New Jersey, the son of Angelina and Frank A. Langella Sr. (d. 1991), a business executive who was president of the Bayonne Barrel and Drum Company. Langella attended Washington Elementary School and Bayonne High School in Bayonne. After the family moved to South Orange, New Jersey, he graduated from Columbia High School in the South Orange-Maplewood School District in 1955 and later graduated from Syracuse University in 1959 with a Bachelor of Arts degree in drama.

Career

Early roles and breakthrough 
Langella appeared off-Broadway (in The Immoralist at the Bouwerie Lane Theatre in 1963 and Robert Lowell's The Old Glory in 1965 among other shows) before he made his first foray onto a Broadway stage in New York in Federico García Lorca's Yerma at the Vivian Beaumont Theater, Lincoln Center, on December 8, 1966. He followed this role by appearing in William Gibson's A Cry of Players, playing a young, highly fictionalized William Shakespeare opposite Anne Bancroft in 1968.

Bancroft suggested Langella to her husband Mel Brooks, who cast him in a leading role in The Twelve Chairs (1970). The same year, he also appeared in Frank Perry's Diary of a Mad Housewife, being nominated for a Golden Globe Award for Most Promising Newcomer. Langella won his first Tony Award for his performance in Edward Albee's Seascape in 1975 and was nominated again for what may have been the performance for which he was best known in the early part of his career: the title role of the 1977 Broadway production of Dracula. Despite his initial misgivings about continuing to play the role, he was persuaded to star opposite Laurence Olivier in the subsequent film version directed by John Badham. 

Langella continued to juggle film and television with his stage work, playing Sherlock Holmes in a 1981 adaptation of William Gillette's play Sherlock Holmes. He repeated the role on Broadway in 1987 in Charles Marowitz's play Sherlock's Last Case. That same year, he portrayed the villain Skeletor in Masters of the Universe, one of his favorite parts. In 1988, he co-starred in the film And God Created Woman. In 1982 Langella portrayed Antonio Salieri the Broadway production of Amadeus replacing Ian McKellen. During this time he also acted in Passion in 1983, Noël Coward's Design for Living in 1984, Arthur Miller's After the Fall in 1984, and David Rabe's Hurlyburly in 1985. He also portrayed Prospero in the revival of William Shakespeare revival The Tempest.

Established actor 
In 1993, he made a three-episode appearance on Star Trek: Deep Space Nine as the devious Bajoran Minister Jaro Essa. That same year, he also starred in the political comedy Dave starring Kevin Kline and Sigourney Weaver. He also played a supporting role in the Ivan Reitman comedy Junior alongside Arnold Schwarzenegger, Danny DeVito, and Emma Thompson. In 1994, he narrated the American Masters documentary on Tennessee Williams. In 1996, Langella starred in the Broadway revival of August Strindberg's The Father. That same year, Langella starred in the comedy film Eddie, starring Whoopi Goldberg, with whom he was involved romantically until 2001. He also played Clare Quilty in the 1997 film adaptation of Lolita, starring Jeremy Irons and Melanie Griffith. In 1999, he starred opposite Johnny Depp in Roman Polanski's film The Ninth Gate.

In 2000, Langella played  Ebenezer Scrooge in a musical version of A Christmas Carol at Madison Square Garden. He has also appeared in notable off-Broadway productions, including in the title role of Robert Kalfin's Chelsea Theater Center production of The Prince of Homburg, which was filmed by PBS for the Theatre in America series. Langella also appeared as Al Baker in "Dominance", a 2003 episode of Law & Order: Special Victims Unit and had a recurring role as Pino in the 2005 short-lived sitcom Kitchen Confidential.

Broadway success 
Langella returned to the stage in the 2002 Broadway revival of the Ivan Turgenev play Fortune's Fool. In the play Langella portrayed Flegont Alexandrovitch Tropatcho	opposite Alan Bates. The production received critical acclaim with Langella winning his second  Tony Award for Best Featured Actor in a Play and a Drama Desk Award for Outstanding Featured Actor in a Play. In 2004 he acted in the original Broadway play Match by Stephen Belber. In the play, Langella portrayed an aging dance choreographer. He acted alongside Jane Adams, and Ray Liotta. Langella received a Tony Award for Best Actor in a Play, his fourth nomination. He starred as Sir Thomas More in the 2008 Broadway revival of A Man for All Seasons.

He was cast as Richard Nixon opposite Michael Sheen in Peter Morgan's play Frost/Nixon, which received enthusiastic reviews during a run at the Donmar Warehouse and Gielgud Theatre in London before moving to Broadway in New York's Bernard B. Jacobs Theater in April 2007. Langella won his third Tony Award for the role. He reprised the role of Nixon in the 2008 Oscar-nominated film of the play directed by Ron Howard. Langella also earned Golden Globe, Screen Actors Guild, and BAFTA nominations for Best Actor for the same performance. He was also nominated for an Academy Award in the Best Actor category for the role, losing to Sean Penn's performance in Milk.

Expansion into film and television 
Langella's film work also includes roles in George Clooney's Good Night, and Good Luck (2005) as former CBS chief executive William S. Paley, for which he was nominated for the Screen Actors Guild Award for Ensemble Cast. He also appeared in Bryan Singer's Superman Returns (2006) as Daily Planet editor Perry White. Langella received critical acclaim as well as the Boston Society of Film Critics Award in 2007 for his sensitive portrayal of an elderly novelist in Starting Out in the Evening. In late 2009, he starred in the Richard Kelly film The Box with Cameron Diaz and James Marsden. In 2010, he played Louis Zabel in Oliver Stone's Wall Street: Money Never Sleeps, alongside Michael Douglas, Shia LaBeouf, and Carey Mulligan. That same year, he played a supporting role in All Good Things, with Ryan Gosling and Kirsten Dunst. In 2011, Langella starred in the drama thriller Unknown, opposite Liam Neeson and Diane Kruger. In 2012, he earned critical praise for his role in the independent film Robot & Frank, with Peter Travers of Rolling Stone magazine calling his performance "a masterclass in acting". 

In 2013, Langella starred as Chief Justice Warren E. Burger in the Stephen Frears' HBO film Muhammad Ali's Greatest Fight, with Christopher Plummer playing Justice John Marshall Harlan. In October and November 2013, Langella played King Lear at the Minerva, Chichester Festival Theatre in Chichester, UK. The play travelled to the Harvey Theater at the Brooklyn Academy of Music in New York in 2014. Langella also played Cleveland Browns owner Anthony Molina in the movie Draft Day, which also starred Kevin Costner, Jennifer Garner, and Dennis Leary. In 2015, Langella joined the cast of FX's critically praised drama The Americans with Keri Russell and Matthew Rhys. He appeared in seasons 3 through 5.

In 2016, he played the title role in Doug Hughes' production of the US premiere of Florian Zeller's play The Father at the Samuel J. Friedman Theatre on Broadway. He won his fourth Tony Award for that performance. That same year, he appeared in Captain Fantastic with Viggo Mortensen and was again nominated with the ensemble cast for the Screen Actors Guild Award. He also starred in the HBO television movie All the Way (2016) as Senator Richard Russell Jr., with Bryan Cranston as Lyndon B. Johnson. Langella received a Critics' Choice Television Award for Best Supporting Actor in a Movie/Miniseries nomination for his performance. From 2018 to 2020, Langella appeared as Sebestian in Showtime's Kidding, starring Jim Carrey. The show's executive producer was Michel Gondry, and it received positive reviews.

In 2020, he played Judge Julius Hoffman in Aaron Sorkin's The Trial of the Chicago 7. The film follows the Chicago Seven, a group of anti-Vietnam War protesters charged with conspiracy and crossing state lines with the intention of inciting riots at the 1968 Democratic National Convention in Chicago. It was released in September, by Netflix. In 2022, Langella was fired from his role in The Fall of the House of Usher following investigations into claims of sexual harassment on set. In a guest column for Deadline, reacting to his firing, Langella claimed to have been "canceled," denying allegations of unacceptable behavior and telling his version of events.

Personal life
Langella was married to Ruth Weil from November 6, 1977 to their divorce in 1995. They have two children, Frank III and Sara. He also lived with actress/comedian Whoopi Goldberg, whom he met on the set of Eddie, from 1995 until they separated in 2000.

Memoir
Langella published a memoir in 2012 called Dropped Names: Famous Men and Women As I Knew Them. 

In a review in the New York Times Book Review, Ada Calhoun wrote that "Langella's book celebrated sluttiness as a worthy—even noble—way of life. There was so much happy sexuality in this book that reading it was like being flirted with for a whole party by the hottest person in the room. It was no wonder Langella was invited everywhere."

Acting credits

Theatre

Film

Television

Video game

Awards and nominations

See also
List of oldest and youngest Academy Award winners and nominees

References

External links

Radio interview on Fresh Air (40 mins; 2012)

1938 births
Male actors from New Jersey
American male film actors
American people of Italian descent
American male stage actors
American male voice actors
Bayonne High School alumni
Drama Desk Award winners
Living people
Actors from Bayonne, New Jersey
People from South Orange, New Jersey
Syracuse University alumni
Tony Award winners
20th-century American male actors
21st-century American male actors
Outstanding Performance by a Cast in a Motion Picture Screen Actors Guild Award winners